José Evaristo Corrales Macías  is a Mexican politician affiliated with the National Action Party. He served as a federal deputy of the LIX Legislature of the Mexican Congress representing Sinaloa as replacement of Alejandro Higuera, and previously served as a local deputy in LVI Legislature of the Congress of Sinaloa.

References

Date of birth unknown
Living people
Politicians from Sinaloa
National Action Party (Mexico) politicians
Year of birth missing (living people)
Members of the Congress of Sinaloa
Deputies of the LIX Legislature of Mexico
Members of the Chamber of Deputies (Mexico) for Sinaloa